Taliaferro Creek is a stream in the U.S. state of Georgia. It is a tributary to the Chattooga River.

Taliaferro Creek was named after Colonel Benjamin Taliaferro of Virginia, who was an officer in the American Revolution.

References

Rivers of Georgia (U.S. state)
Rivers of Chattooga County, Georgia